Aliaksandr Bury and Lloyd Harris were the defending champions but chose not to defend their title.

Max Purcell and Luke Saville won the title after defeating David Pel and Hans Podlipnik Castillo 4–6, 7–5, [10–5] in the final.

Seeds

Draw

References

External links
 Main draw

Kunming Open - Men's Doubles
2019 Men's Doubles